Serhat Dogukan Tasdemir (born 21 July 2000) is a professional footballer who plays as an attacking midfielder for TFF Second League side Kocaelispor. Born in England, he has represented Azerbaijan at youth level.

Club career

AFC Fylde
Tasdemir signed for AFC Fylde at the age of 15, following his release from Blackburn Rovers. He made his first-team debut at just 16 in the Lancashire FA Challenge Trophy vs A.F.C. Darwen, scoring a first-half hat trick.  Following this, Tasdemir made his National League debut against Bromley, in September 2017, aged 17. He scored just 14 minutes after coming off of the bench.

Peterborough United
On 1 July 2019, EFL League One side Peterborough United signed Tasdemir on a 3-year deal for a six-figure undisclosed fee. Tasdemir made his debut in an EFL Cup match against Oxford United on 13 August 2019, making his league debut four days later against Ipswich Town. He scored his first goal for Peterborough in an EFL Trophy tie against West Ham United U21s on 8 December 2020.

He moved on loan to Oldham Athletic on 1 February 2021.

On 11 May 2021 he was made available for transfer by Peterborough. Tasdemir joined Barnet on a season-long loan in July 2021. He scored three times in 23 appearances for the Bees. Tasdemir was released by Posh at the end of the 2021–22 season.

He signed for Buxton for the 2022–23 season. After 11 appearances, he signed for Kocaelispor on a 2.5 year contract on 18 January 2023.

International career
After being called up by Azerbaijan U19 in January 2019, Tasdemir marked his debut in a friendly fixture against the Krasnodar Region with a goal. Tasdemir went on to feature in three UEFA European Under-19 Championship qualifying games, starting against the Republic of Ireland and Romania and coming off the bench against Russia.

Career statistics

References

2000 births
Living people
Footballers from Blackburn
Azerbaijani footballers
English footballers
Association football midfielders
Blackburn Rovers F.C. players
AFC Fylde players
Peterborough United F.C. players
Oldham Athletic A.F.C. players
Barnet F.C. players
Buxton F.C. players
Kocaelispor footballers
National League (English football) players
English Football League players
Azerbaijan youth international footballers
English people of Azerbaijani descent